The Men's 4 × 100 m Relay athletics events for the 2012 Summer Paralympics took place at the London Olympic Stadium on 5 September. A total of two events were contested over this distance incorporating six different classifications.

Results

T11-T13

T42-T46
South Africa won with a world record time of 41.78 seconds. The team included Samkelo Radebe on the first leg, Zivan Smith on the second leg, Arnu Fourie on the third leg and Oscar Pistorius on the anchor leg.

References

Athletics at the 2012 Summer Paralympics
2012 in men's athletics